Richard Stanford (21 June 1754 – 16 July 1792) was an English cricketer who played for Kent.

Richard Stanford was born in East Peckham, Kent and made 12 known first-class appearances between 1777 and 1787 for various Kent and England teams.

References 
 Fresh Light on 18th Century Cricket by G B Buckley (FL18)
 Scores & Biographies, Volume 1 by Arthur Haygarth (SBnnn)
 The Dawn of Cricket by H T Waghorn (WDC)

English cricketers
Kent cricketers
English cricketers of 1701 to 1786
1754 births
1792 deaths
English cricketers of 1787 to 1825
West Kent cricketers
East Kent cricketers
Non-international England cricketers